The 79th Air Refueling Squadron is a United States Air Force Reserve squadron, assigned to the 349th Operations Group, stationed at Travis Air Force Base, California.  It is a USAF Associate Unit of the active duty 9th Air Refueling Squadron, 60th Air Mobility Wing.

History

World War II
Formed in April 1943 by I Troop Carrier Command, trained and equipped at various bases in the United States for the balance of the year.  Deployed to England, being assigned to IX Troop Carrier Command in early January 1944, during the Allied buildup prior to the invasion of France.

The squadron participated in the D-Day operation, dropping 101st Airborne Division paratroops near Cherbourg Naval Base, then carried out re-supply and glider delivery missions the following day.

The squadron's aircraft flew supplies into Normandy as soon as suitable landing strips were available and evacuated casualties to England. On 17 July the air echelon flew to Grosseto airbase in Italy to prepare for operations connected with the invasion of southern France returning to England on 24 August.

Squadron moved to France in July 1944 and for the balance of the Northern France Campaign and the Western Allied invasion of Germany was engaged in combat resupply of ground forces, operating from Advanced Landing Grounds in northern France.   Delivered supplies to rough Resupply and Evacuation airfields near the front lines, returning combat casualties to field hospitals in rear areas.   Dropped airborne forces during Operation Market-Garden in September 1944 into the Netherlands; later participated in the airborne invasion of Germany in March 1945.  After V-E Day, the squadron evacuated prisoners of war.
Returned to the United States in August 1945, became a transport squadron for Continental Air Command, Inactivated on 15 November 1945.

Reserve operations and Korean War mobilization
Operated in the reserve, 1948–1951 with C-47s, activated during the Korean War.  Its personnel and aircraft assigned as fillers for active-duty units,  inactivated a few days later as an administrative unit.

Reserve airlift operations
It performed worldwide airlift operations from, 1966–1971, including missions to Southeast Asia.

Early warning for the southern United States
The squadron also flew airborne early warning and control missions in the air defense of the United States, using Lockheed EC-121 Warning Stars from its base at Homestead AFB Florida, 1971–1978.

Reserve associate air refueling
Since 1982 it has trained for and flown worldwide air refueling and strategic airlift missions, including contingency and humanitarian relief operations.   Supported Operations Enduring Freedom and Noble Eagle after the 11 September 2001 attack on the U. S.

Campaigns and decorations
 Campaigns. World War II: Rome-Arno; Normandy; Northern France; Southern France; Rhineland; Ardennes-Alsace; Central Europe.
 Decorations. Distinguished Unit Citation: France, [6–7] June 1944. Air Force Outstanding Unit Award with Combat "V" Device: 1 August 2002 – 15 August 2003. Air Force Outstanding Unit Awards: 1 December 1976 – 15 March 1978; 1 April 1984 – 31 March 1985; 1 July 1991 – 30 June 1993; 1 April – 15 August 1995; 1 July 1996 – 30 June 1998; 1 August 2000 – 31 July 2002; 16 August 2003 – 17 August 2004; 18 August 2004 – 17 August 2005; 18 August 2005 – 17 August 2006; 18 August 2006 – 17 August 2007; 18 August 2007 – 17 August 2008; 18 August 2008 – 17 August 2009. Republic of Vietnam Gallantry Cross with Palm: 1 July 1966 – 29 July 1971.

Lineage
 Constituted as the 79th Troop Carrier Squadron on 23 March 1943
 Activated on 1 April 1943
 Inactivated on 15 November 1945
 Activated in the Reserve on 11 April 1948
 Redesignated 79th Troop Carrier Squadron, Medium on 27 June 1949
 Ordered to active service on 1 April 1951
 Inactivated on 16 April 1951
 Activated in the Reserve on 18 May 1955
 Inactivated on 15 May 1958
 Redesignated 79th Military Airlift Squadron and activated in the Reserve on 14 March 1966
 Organized on 1 April 1966
 Redesignated 79th Airborne Early Warning and Control Squadron on 30 June 1971
 Inactivated on 1 October 1978
 Redesignated 79th Air Refueling Squadron, Heavy (Associate) on 21 June 1982
 Activated in the Reserve on 1 September 1982
 Redesignated 79th Air Refueling Squadron (Associate) on 1 February 1992
 Redesignated 79th Air Refueling Squadron on 1 October 1994

Assignments
 436th Troop Carrier Group, 1 April 1943 – 15 November 1945
 419th Troop Carrier Group, 11 April 1948
 436th Troop Carrier Group, 27 June 1949 – 16 April 1951
 436th Troop Carrier Group, 18 May 1955 – 15 May 1958
 Continental Air Command, 14 March 1966
 915th Military Airlift Group, 1 April 1966
 Eastern Air Force Reserve Region, 30 July 1971
 Tenth Air Force, 8 October 1976
 915th Airborne Early Warning and Control Group, 1 December 1976 – 1 October 1978
 452d Air Refueling Wing, 1 September 1982
 452d Operations Group, 1 August 1992
 349th Operations Group, 1 April 1995 – present

Stations

 Baer Field, Indiana, 1 April 1943
 Alliance Army Air Field, Nebraska, 2 May 1943
 Laurinburg-Maxton Army Air Base, North Carolina, 4 August 1943
 Baer Field, Indiana, 16–28 December 1943
 RAF Bottesford (AAF-481), England, January 1944
 RAF Membury (AAF-466), England, 3 March 1944 – February 1945
 Operated from Voltone Airfield, Italy, 20 July – 23 August 1944
 Mourmelon-le-Grand Airfield (A-80), France, February – July 1945
 Baer Field, Indiana, 13 August 1945

 Malden Army Air Field, Missouri, 8 September – 15 November 1945
 Norfolk Municipal Airport, Virginia, 11 April 1948
 Godman Air Force Base, Kentucky, 27 June 1949
 Standiford Field, Kentucky, 20 October 1950 – 16 April 195
 Floyd Bennett Field (later U.S. Naval Air Station, New York), New York, 18 May 1955 – 15 May 1958
 Homestead Air Force Base, Florida, 1 April 1966 – 1 October 1978
 March Air Force Base, California, 1 September 1982
 Travis Air Force Base, California, 1 April 1995 – present

Aircraft

C-47 Skytrain (1943–1945, 1948–1951)
T-7 Navigator (1948–1951)
Beechcraft T-11 Kansan (1948–1951)
C-46 Commando (1955–1958)
C-119 Flying Boxcar (1957–1958)

C-124 Globemaster II (1966–1971)
C-121 Constellation (1971–1973, 1976–1978)
 EC-121 Warning Star (1971–1978)
KC-10 Extender (1982–present)

References

Notes

Bibliography

External links

Military units and formations in California
079